Wanderful interactive storybooks is a developer of interactive storybook apps based on the titles originally published as Living Books by Broderbund Software.

The company was founded in 2010 by Mickey W. Mantle, who oversaw the original Living Books technology development as Vice President of Engineering and Chief Technical Officer at Broderbund.

Mantle, CEO of Wanderful, assembled a small team of the original Broderbund programmers to create a new engine that could take the animation, graphics, sound and music from the original Living Books CD-ROMs and play them back at full-screen resolution on the iPad using a touch, rather than a mouse driven interface. Mark Schlichting – creator  of the Living Books series – joined the team as Chief Creative Officer and developed touch-driven updates to the original mouse-driven interface.

Through a number of corporate mergers, the publisher Houghton Mifflin Harcourt had acquired the rights to the Living Books titles and content.  Wanderful secured the rights from HMH to republish the new and updated titles and concurrently negotiated rights with many of the authors of the individual stories that became Living Books.

Living Books titles 
Wanderful has rereleased the following Living Books titles for iOS (in order by release date):

 Arthur's Teacher Trouble  (English and Spanish) by Marc Brown
 Little Monster at School  (English and Spanish) by Mercer Mayer
 The Tortoise and the Hare  (English and Spanish) an Aesop fable
 Harry and the Haunted House (English and Spanish) by Mark Schlichting
 Berenstain Bears Get In A Fight  (English and Spanish) by Stan and Jan Berenstain
 Arthur's Birthday  (English and Spanish) by Marc Brown
 Berenstain Bears In The Dark  (English) by Stan and Jan Berenstain
 Ruff's Bone  (English and Spanish) By Eli Noyes
 The New Kid on the Block (English) by Jack Prelutsky, Illustrated by James Stevenson
 Stellaluna (English and Portuguese) by Janell Cannon
 Just Grandma and Me (English, Japanese and Spanish) by Mercer Mayer

Educational Elements 
Wanderful has created classroom activities guides for each of the story apps. The activities in the guides are aligned with the Common Core State Standards Initiative.

References

External links 
 The return of Living Books
 Harry And The Haunted House For iOS Gets It Right - David Winograd, Mac Observer
 Going Retro: Reading Apps for Real Books (blog post at KQED/MindShift)
 Just Wanderful! Living Books Are Back! - The Daring Librarian
 Interview with Mark Schlichting

Companies based in Marin County, California
American companies established in 2010
Novato, California
2010 establishments in California